A ball camera or camera ball is a spherical camera, one version of which has been designed to be thrown into the air to take panoramic pictures from a height or in an inaccessible or dangerous location. Several models of "throwable ball cameras" have been developed in the 2010s.  In 2017 a floating version of the ball camera was designed for use in zero-gravity environments, such as in the International Space Station, and was dubbed the Int ball, or JEM Internal Ball Camera

See also
Panono
Int-Ball

References

Cameras by type
Panoramic cameras